The Autonomous University of Tamaulipas (in ) is a Mexican public university based in Ciudad Victoria, Tamaulipas. Throughout the larger cities of Reynosa, Matamoros, Nuevo Laredo, and Tampico and smaller cities of Ciudad Mante and Valle Hermoso are UAT campuses that offer undergraduate studies.

Each of the various university faculties offer graduate studies leading to the Master's or Doctorate Degree. The Faculty of Medicine of Tampico offers the professional degree of Physician & Surgeon (Medico-Cirujano) as well as post-graduate specialty certificates in: pediatrics, internal medicine, surgery, obstetrics & gynecology, family practice, and intensive care medicine. The university's "Center of Excellence" (Centro de Excelencia) sponsors specialized professional certificates and studies for the state of Tamaulipas.

History
It was founded on 30 October 1950 at the port of Tampico as Educación Profesional de Tampico, A.C. (Tampico's Professional Education), a civil organization that sponsored a Faculty of Law and a Faculty of Medicine that were later incorporated into a public school under the auspices of the National Autonomous University of Mexico. On 5 November 1972, it was recognized as an autonomous university.

Since Ciudad Victoria is the Tamaulipas capital city, the rectory building and the main administrative offices are headquartered in there.  The main faculties of business, law, natural sciences, education and agriculture are based there as well. Ciudad Victoria is also the home of the university's football soccer team, the Correcaminos UAT.

The principal site of medicine, dentistry, nursing, law and engineering are in Tampico.  The northern Tamaulipas cities of Matamoros and Nuevo Laredo each have smaller university campuses.

Campuses

References

Autonomous University of Tamaulipas
Ciudad Victoria
Educational institutions established in 1950
1950 establishments in Mexico